Rudy Hernandez or Hernández may refer to:

 Rudy Hernández (pitcher) (1931–2022), Major League Baseball pitcher from the Dominican Republic
 Rudy Hernández (shortstop) (born 1951), Major League Baseball shortstop from Mexico
 Rodolfo P. Hernández (1931–2013), American soldier and Medal of Honor recipient
 Rudy Hernández (baseball, born 1968), Venezuelan Major League coach